The 1988 Brands Hatch 1000 km was the seventh round of the 1988 World Sportscar Championship season.  It took place at Brands Hatch, United Kingdom on 24 July 1988.

Official results
Class winners in bold.  Cars failing to complete 75% of the winner's distance marked as Not Classified (NC).

Statistics
 Pole Position - #61 Team Sauber Mercedes - 1:14.170
 Fastest Lap - #61 Team Sauber Mercedes - 1:15.820
 Average Speed - 180.747 km/h

References

 
 

B
Brands